This is a list of populated places in Montenegro, sorted by municipality. Places with more than 1,000 residents are shown in italics. For each settlement with a significant Albanian population, the Albanian name for the settlement is given after a forward-slash (/).

Andrijevica

Andrijevica
Andželati
Bojovići
Božići
Cecuni
Đulići
Dulipolje
Gnjili Potok
Gornje Luge
Gračanica
Jošanica
Košutići
Kralje
Kuti
Oblo Brdo
Prisoja
Rijeka Marsenića
Seoca
Sjenožeta
Slatina
Trepča
Trešnjevo
Ulotina
Zabrđe

Bar

Arbnež
Bar
Bartula
Besa
Bjeliši
Bobovište
Boljevići 
Braćeni
Brca
Brijege
Bukovik
Burtaiši
Čeluga
Ckla
Dabezići
Dedići
Đenđinovići
Dobra Voda 
Donja Briska
Donji Brčeli
Donji Murići
Dračevica
Dupilo
Đuravci
Đurmani
Gluhi Do
Godinje
Gornja Briska 
Gornji Brčeli
Gornji Murići 
Grdovići
Gurza
Karanikići
Komarno
Koštanjica
Krnjice
Kruševica
Kunje
Limljani
Livari
Lukići
Mačuge
Mala Gorana
Mali Mikulići 
Mali Ostros
Marstijepovići
Martići
Miljevci
Mišići
Orahovo
Ovtočići
Papani
Pečurice
Pelinkovići
Pinčići
Podi
Polje
Popratnica
Seoca
Sotonići
Sozina
Stari Bar
Šušanj
Sustaš
Sutomore
Tejani 
Tomba
Tomići
Trnovo
Tuđemili 
Turčini
Utrg
Velembusi
Veliki Mikulići
Veliki Ostros
Velja Gorana
Velje Selo
Virpazar
Vučedabići
Zagrađe
Zaljevo
Zankovići
Zgrade
Zupci

Berane

Babino
Bastahe
Beran Selo
Berane
Bubanje
Buče
Budimlja
Crni Vrh
Crvljevine
Dapsići
Dolac
Donja Ržanica
Donje Luge
Donje Zaostro
Dragosava
Glavaca
Goražde
Gornje Zaostro
Jašovići
Kaludra
Kurikuće
Lazi
Lubnice
Lužac
Mašte
Mezgalji
Orah
Pešca
Petnjik
Praćevac
Radmuževići
Rovca
Rujišta
Skakavac
Štitari
Tmušići
Veliđe
Vinicka
Vuča
Zagorje
Zagrad
Zagrađe

Bijelo Polje

Babaići
Barice
Bijedići
Bijelo Polje
Bliškovo
Bojišta
Boljanina
Boturići
Čeoče
Cerovo
Čokrlije
Crhalj
Crnča
Crniš
Đalovići
Dobrakovo
Dobrinje
Dolac
Dubovo
Džafića Brdo
Femića Krš
Godijevo
Goduša
Grab
Grančarevo
Gubavač
Ivanje
Jablanovo
Jabučno
Jagoče
Kanje
Kičava
Korita
Kostenica
Kostići
Kovren
Kukulje
Laholo
Lazovići
Lekovina
Lijeska
Lješnica
Lozna
Loznica
Majstorovina
Metanjac
Milovo
Mioče
Mirojevići
Mojstir
Mokri Lug
Muslići
Nedakusi
Negobratina
Njegnjevo
Obrov
Okladi
Orahovica
Osmanbegovo Selo
Ostrelj
Pali
Pape
Pavino Polje
Pećarska
Pobretići
Poda
Potkrajci
Potrk
Požeginja
Prijelozi
Pripčići
Radojeva Glava
Radulići
Rakita
Rakonje
Rasovo
Rastoka
Ravna Rijeka
Resnik
Rodijelja
Sadići
Sela
Sipanje
Šipovice
Sokolac
Sutivan
Srđevac
Stožer
Stubo
Tomaševo
Trubine
Ujniče
Unevine
Voljavac
Vrh
Zaton
Žiljak
Zminac
Žurena

Budva

Bečići
Blizikuće
Boreti
Brajići
Brda
Budva
Buljarica
Čami Do
Čelobrdo
Čučuke
Đenaši
Drobnići
Ilino Brdo
Kaluđerac
Katun Reževići
Krstac
Kuljače
Lapčići
Markovići
Novoselje
Petrovac
Pobori
Podbabac
Podostrog
Prijevor
Pržno
Rađenovići
Rijeka Reževići
Stanišići
Sveti Stefan
Tudorovići
Viti Do
Žukovica

Cetinje

Bajice
Barjamovica
Bijele Poljane
Bjeloši
Bobija
Boguti
Bokovo
Češljari
Cetinje
Čevo
Đalci
Dide
Đinovići
Dobrska Župa
Dobrsko Selo
Dodoši
Donja Zaljut
Donje Selo
Dragomi Do
Drušići
Dubovik
Dubovo
Dugi Do
Dujeva
Erakovići
Gađi
Gornja Zaljut
Gornji Ceklin
Grab
Građani
Gradina
Izvori
Jankovići
Jezer
Kobilji Do
Kopito
Kosijeri
Kranji Do
Kućišta
Lastva
Lipa
Lješev Stub
Majstori
Malošin Do
Markovina
Meterizi
Mikulići
Milijevići
Mužovići
Njeguši
Obzovica
Oćevići
Očinići
Ožegovice
Pačarađe
Pejovići
Petrov Do
Poda
Podbukovica
Prediš
Prekornica
Prentin Do
Prevlaka
Proseni Do
Radomir
Raičevići
Resna
Riječani
Rijeka Crnojevića
Rokoči
Rvaši
Ržani Do
Šinđon / Shëngjon
Smokovci
Štitari
Tomići
Trešnjevo
Trnjine
Uba
Ubli
Ublice
Ugnji
Ulići
Velestovo
Vignjevići
Vojkovići
Vrba
Vrela
Vučji Do
Žabljak / Zhabjak
Zabrđe
Začir
Zagora
Žanjev Do

Danilovgrad

Bare Šumanovića
Begovina
Bileća
Bobulja
Bogićevići
Boronjina
Braćani
Brajovići
Brijestovo
Ćurčići
Ćurilac
Dabojevići
Daljam
Danilovgrad
Đeđezi
Do Pješivački
Dolovi
Donje Selo
Donji Martinići
Donji Rsojevići
Drakovići
Đuričkovići
Frutak
Glizica
Gorica
Gornji Martinići
Gornji Rsojevići
Gostilje Brajovićko
Gostilje Martinićko
Gradina
Grbe
Grlić
Gruda
Jabuke
Jastreb
Jelenak
Jovanovići
Klikovače
Kopito
Kosić
Kujava
Kupinovo
Lalevići
Lazarev Krst
Livade
Lubovo
Malenza
Mandići
Mijokusovići
Miogost
Mokanje
Mosori
Musterovići
Novo Selo
Orja Luka
Pažići
Pitome Loze
Podglavica
Podvraće
Poljica
Potkula
Potočilo
Povrhpoljina
Požar
Rošca
Ržišta
Sekulići
Sladojevo Kopito
Slap
Slatina
Šobaići
Spuž / Shpuza
Sretnja
Strahinići
Šume
Tvorilo
Veleta
Vinići
Viš
Vučica
Zagorak
Zagreda
Župa

Gusinje
Dolja / Dolla
Dosuđe / Dosugja
Grnčar / Gërnçar
Gusinje / Gucia
Kolenovići / Kolenaj
Kruševo / Krusheva
Martinovići / Martinaj
Višnjevo / Vishnjeva
Vusanje / Vuthaj

Herceg Novi

Baošići
Bijela
Bijelske Kruševice
Đenovići
Đurići
Gomila
Herceg Novi
Igalo
Jošice
Kameno
Kruševice
Kumbor
Kuti
Luštica
Meljine
Mojdež
Mokrine
Podi
Prijevor
Provodina
Ratiševina
Savina
Sasovići
Sušćepan
Sutorina
Trebesinj
Ubli
Zelenika
Žlijebi

Kolašin

Babljak
Bakovići
Bare
Bare Kraljske
Blatina
Bojići
Breza
Cerovice
Crkvine
Donje Lipovo
Dragovića Polje
Drijenak
Drpe
Đuđevina
Dulovine
Gornja Rovca Bulatovići
Gornje Lipovo
Izlasci
Jabuka
Jasenova
Kolašin
Kos
Liješnje
Lipovska Bistrica
Ljevišta
Ljuta
Manastir Morača
Mateševo
Međuriječje
Mioska
Moračka Bistrica
Moračko Trebaljevo
Mrtvo Duboko
Mujića Rečine
Mušovića Rijeka
Oćiba
Ocka Gora
Osretci
Padež
Pčinja
Petrova Ravan
Plana
Požnja
Radigojno
Raičevina
Raško
Ravni
Redice
Rovačko Trebaljevo
Sela
Selišta
Sjerogošte
Skrbuša
Smailagića Polje
Smrče
Sreteška Gora
Starče
Svrke
Tara
Trnovica
Ulica
Uvač
Velje Duboko
Višnje
Vladoš
Vlahovići
Vojkovići
Vranještica
Vrujica
Žirci

Kotor

Bigova
Bratešići
Bunovići
Veliki Zalazi
Višnjeva
Vranovići
Glavati
Glavatičići
Gornji Morinj
Gornji Orahovac
Gornji Stoliv
Gorovići
Dobrota
Donji Morinj
Donji Orahovac
Donji Stoliv
Dragalj
Dražin Vrt
Dub
Zagora
Zvečava
Kavač
Knežlaz
Kovači
Kolužunj
Kostanjica
Kotor
Krimovica
Kubasi
Lastva Grbaljska
Ledenice
Lipci
Lješevići
Mali Zalazi
Malov Do
Mirac
Muo
Nalježići
Pelinovo
Perast
Pištet
Pobrđe
Prijeradi
Prčanj
Radanovići
Risan
Strp
Sutvara
Trešnjica
Ukropci
Unijerina
Han
Čavori
Šišići
Škaljari
Špiljari

Mojkovac

Bistrica
Bjelojevići
Bojna Njiva
Brskovo
Dobrilovina
Gojakovići
Lepenac
Mojkovac
Podbišće
Polja
Prošćenje
Stevanovac
Štitarica
Uroševina
Žari

Nikšić

Balosave
Bare
Bastaji
Bjeloševina
Bobotovo Groblje
Bogetići
Bogmilovići
Brestice
Brezovik
Broćanac Nikšićki
Broćanac Viluški
Bršno
Bubrežak
Busak
Carine
Cerovo
Crnodoli
Dolovi
Donja Trepča
Donje Čarađe
Donje Crkvice
Dragovoljići
Drenoštica
Dubočke
Dučice
Duga
Gornja Trepča
Gornje Čarađe
Gornje Crkvice
Gornje Polje
Goslić
Gradačka Poljana
Grahovac
Grahovo
Granice
Gvozd
Ivanje
Jabuke
Jasenovo Polje
Javljen
Jugovići
Kamensko
Kazanci
Klenak
Koprivice
Koravlica
Kovači
Kunak
Kuside
Kuta
Laz
Liverovići
Lukovo
Macavare
Međeđe
Miljanići
Miločani
Milojevići
Miruše
Mokri Do
Morakovo
Nikšić
Nudo
Oblatno
Orah
Orlina
Ozrinići
Petrovići
Pilatovci
Počekovići
Podbožur
Podvrš
Ponikvica
Povija
Praga
Prigradina
Prisoje
Rastovac
Riđani
Riječani
Rudine
Šipačno
Sjenokosi
Smrduša
Somina
Spila
Srijede
Staro Selo
Štedim
Štitari
Stuba
Stubica
Tupan
Ubli
Vasiljevići
Velimlje
Vidne
Vilusi
Vir
Višnjića Do
Vitasojevići
Vraćenovići
Vrbica
Vučji Do
Zagora
Zagrad
Zaljutnica
Zaslap
Zavrh
Zlostup

Petnjica
Azane
Bor
Dašča Rijeka
Dobrodole
Donja Vrbica
Godočelje
Gornja Vrbica
Javorova
Johovica
Kalica
Kruščica
Lagatori
Lješnica
Murovac
Orahovo
Pahulj
Petnjica
Ponor
Poroče
Radmanci
Savin Bor
Trpezi
Tucanje
Vrševo

Plav

Bogajići / Bogaj
Brezojevica /Brezovica
Đurička Rijeka / Reka e Xhurës
Gornja Rženica / Rëzhnica e Epërme
Hoti / Hoti
Mašnica / Mashnica
Meteh
Murino / Murina
Novšići / Nokshiq
Plav / Pllava
Prnjavor / Prnjavori
Skić
Velika
Vojno Selo

Plužine

Babići
Bajovo Polje
Barni Do
Bezuje
Bojati
Boričje
Borkovići
Brijeg
Brljevo
Bukovac
Crkvičko Polje
Donja Brezna
Dubljevići
Goransko
Gornja Brezna
Jerinići
Kneževići
Kovači
Lisina
Miljkovac
Miloševići
Mratinje
Nedajno
Nikovići
Osojni Orah
Pišče
Plužine
Poljana
Prisojni Orah
Ravno
Rudinice
Šarići
Seljani
Smriječno
Stabna
Stolac
Stubica
Trsa
Unač
Vojinovići
Zabrđe
Žeično
Zukva

Pljevlja

Alići
Beljkovići
Bjeloševina
Bobovo
Boljanići
Borišići
Borova
Borovica
Boščinovići
Brda
Bujaci
Burići
Bušnje
Čardak
Čavanj
Čerjenci
Cerovci
Čestin
Crljenice
Crni Vrh
Crno Brdo
Crnobori
Donja Brvenica
Dragaši
Dubac
Dubočica
Dubrava
Đuli
Đurđevića Tara
Durutovići
Dužice
Geuši
Glibaći
Glisnica
Gornja Brvenica
Gornje Selo
Gotovuša
Gradac
Gradina
Grevo
Hoćevina
Horevina
Jabuka
Jagodni Do
Jahovići
Jasen
Jugovo
Kakmuži
Kalušići
Katun
Klakorina
Kolijevka
Komine
Kordovina
Kosanica
Košare
Kotlajići
Kotline
Kotorac
Kovačevići
Kovači
Kozica
Krće
Krupice
Kruševo
Kržava
Kukavica
Lađana
Leovo Brdo
Lever Tara
Lijeska
Ljuće
Ljutići
Lugovi
Madžari
Male Krće
Maoče
Mataruge
Meljak
Metaljka
Mijakovići
Milakovići
Milunići
Mironići
Moćevići
Moraice
Mrčevo
Mrčići
Mrzovići
Nange
Obarde
Odžak
Ograđenica
Orlja
Otilovići
Paljevine
Pauče
Petine
Pižure
Plakala
Planjsko
Pliješ
Pliješevina
Pljevlja
Poblaće
Podborova
Popov Do
Potkovač
Potkrajci
Potoci
Potpeće
Potrlica
Pračica
Prehari
Premćani
Prisoji
Prošće
Pušanjski Do
Rabitlje
Rađevići
Romac
Rudnica
Rujevica
Selac
Selišta
Sirčići
Slatina
Šljivansko
Šljuke
Srećanje
Stančani
Strahov Do
Stranice
Šula
Šumani
Tatarovina
Trnovice
Tvrdakovići
Uremovići
Varine
Vaškovo
Velike Krće
Vidre
Vijenac
Vilići
Višnjica
Vodno
Vojtina
Vrba
Vrbica
Vrulja
Vukšići
Zabrđe
Zaselje
Zbljevo
Zekavice
Zenica
Židovići
Zorlovići

Podgorica

Balabani
Baloči
Begova Glavica
Beri
Berislavci
Bezjovo
Bigor
Bijelo Polje
Bioče
Bistrice
Blizna
Bolesestra
Botun
Brežine
Briđe
Brskut
Buronji
Ćafa
Ćepetići
Crnci
Crvena Paprat
Cvilin
Dolovi
Donje Stravče
Donji Kokoti / Kokoti i Poshtëm
Draževina
Dučići
Duga
Đurkovići
Duške
Farmaci
Fundina / Fundëna
Goljemadi / Gojëmadhi
Golubovci
Goričani
Gornje Stravče
Gornji Kokoti / Kokoti i Epërm
Gostilj
Gradac
Grbavci
Grbi Do
Kiselica
Klopot
Kopilje
Korita / Koritë
Kornet
Kosor
Kruse
Kržanja
Kurilo
Lekići / Lekaj
Liješnje
Liješta
Lijeva Rijeka
Ljajkovići
Lopate
Lutovo
Lužnica
Mahala / Mëhalla
Mataguži / Mataguzhi
Medun / Meduni
Mileti
Mitrovići
Mojanovići / Mojanoviqi
Momče
Mrke / Mërka
Opasanica
Orahovo
Oraovice
Orasi
Ožezi
Parci
Pelev Brijeg
Petrovići
Podgorica / Podgoricë
Ponari
Prisoja
Progonovići
Raći
Radeća
Radovče
Releza
Rijeka Piperska
Seoca
Seoštica
Sjenice / Sjenica
Slacko
Srpska
Staniselići
Stanjevića Rupa
Stijena
Stupovi
Šušunja
Trmanje
Tuzi Ljevorečke
Ubalac
Ubli
Velje Brdo
Veruša
Vidijenje
Vilac
Vranjina
Vrbica
Vukovci
Zagreda
Zaugao
Žabljak Crnojevića

Rožaje

Bać / Baçi
Balotići / Balotiqi
Bandžov / Banxhovi
Bašča / Bashqa
Besnik / Besniku
Bijela Crkva / Bellacërka
Biševo / Bisheva
Bogaji
Bukovica
Crnokrpe / Cërnokërpi
Dacići / Dacaj
Donja Lovnica / Lovnice e Poshtëme
Gornja Lovnica / Lovnica e Epërme
Grahovo / Grahova
Grižice / Grizhica
Ibarac / Ibërci
Jablanica / Jablani
Kalače / Kalaçi
Koljeno / Kolena
Paučina / Pauçina
Plumci / Pëllumbësi
Radetina
Rožaje / Rozhaja
Seošnica / Seoshnica
Sinanovići / Sinanoviqi
Vuča / Vuçi

Šavnik

Bare
Boan
Dobra Sela
Donja Bijela
Donja Bukovica
Dubrovsko
Duži
Godijelji
Gornja Bijela
Gornja Bukovica
Grabovica
Komarnica
Krnja Jela
Malinsko
Miloševići
Mljetičak
Mokro
Petnjica
Pošćenje
Previš
Pridvorica
Provalija
Šavnik
Slatina
Strug
Timar
Tušina

Tivat

Bogdašići
Bogišići
Donja Lastva
Đuraševići
Gornja Lastva
Gošići
Krasići
Lepetani
Milovići
Mrčevac
Radovići
Tivat

Tuzi
Arza / Arrëza
Barlaj
Benkaj
Budza / Budëza
Cijevna / Cemi
Delaj
Dinoša / Dinosha
Donji Milješ / Mileshi i Poshtëm
Drešaj / Dreshaj
Drume / Druma
Dušići / Dushi
Gornji Milješ / Mileshi i Epërm
Gurec / Gurreci
Helmnica / Helmnica
Koći / Kojë
Kotrabudan / Kodërbudani
Krševo / Kësheva
Lovka / Llofka
Mužeška / Muzheçku
Nabon / Nabomi
Nikmaraš / Nikmarashi
Omerbožovići / Ymerbozhaj or Bozhaj
Pikalj / Pikal
Podhum / Nënhelmi
Poprat / Poprati
Prifti / Prifti
Rakića Kuće / Shtëpia e Rakiqëve
Rudine / Rudina
Selište / Selishti
Skorać / Skoraqi
Spinja / Spi
Stjepovo / Stjepohi
Sukuruć / Sukuruqi
Traboin /Traboini
Tuzi
Vladni / Vllana
Vranj / Vranji
Vuksanlekići / Vuksanlekaj

Ulcinj

Ambula / Amull
Bijela Gora / Mal i Bardhë
Bojke / Bojkë
Brajše / Brajshë
Bratica / Braticë
Briska Gora / Mali i Brisë
Ćurke / Qurkaj 
Darza / Darzë
Donja Klezna / Klezna e Poshtme
Donji Štoj / Shtoj i Poshtëm
Draginje / Dragaj
Fraskanjel / Fraskanjell
Gornja Klezna / Klezna e Epërme
Gornji Štoj / Shtoj i Epërm
Kaliman / Kalimani
Kodre / Kodër
Kolonza 
Kosići / Kosiq
Kravari / Kravari
Kruče / Kruça
Kruta / Krutë
Krute / Krythë
Leskovac
Lisna Bore
Međureč / Megjureç
Mide / Millë
Možura / Mozhurë
Pistula / Pistull
Rastiš / Rastish
Reč /Reç
Salč / Salç
Šas / Shas
Štodra / Shtodhër
Sukobin / Sukobinë
Sutjel / Sutjell
Sveti Đorđe / Shëngjergj
Ulcinj / Ulqini
Vladimir / Katërkollë
Zoganj / Zogaj

Žabljak

Borje
Brajkovača
Dobri Nugo
Gomile
Gradina
Krš
Mala Crna Gora
Motički Gaj
Ninkovići
Njegovuđa
Novakovići
Palež
Pašina Voda
Pašino Polje
Pitomine
Podgora
Pošćenski Kraj
Rasova
Rudanci
Šljivansko
Šumanovac
Suvodo
Tepačko Polje
Tepca
Virak
Vrela
Žabljak
Zminica

See also
Subdivisions of Montenegro
Municipalities of Montenegro
List of regions of Montenegro
Cities and towns of Montenegro

External links
 Official results of 2003 census in Montenegro (Serbian only)

Geography of Montenegro
 
Populated places
Montenegro